HD 65750, also known as V341 Carinae is a bright red giant star in the constellation Carina. It is surrounded by a prominent reflection nebula, known as IC 2220, nicknamed the Toby Jug Nebula.

Characteristics

HD 65750 is located about 900 light years away, and has an apparent magnitude that varies between 6.2 and 7.1 and a metallicity just  of the Sun. It is part of the Diamond Cluster moving group.

Nebulae
The nebulae is a mystery as the variations in nebulae brightness appear to be unrelated to the host star.
One theory is that rather than being an accreting protoplanetary disk the star may be an evolved star that is losing material.

References

 
Reflection nebulae
Carinae, V341
065750
3126
Durchmusterung objects
038834
Slow irregular variables
M-type bright giants